The Meeting was the first album release from a collaboration of musicians R&B keyboardist/singer Patrice Rushen, saxophonist Ernie Watts, bassist Alphonso Johnson and drummer Leon "Ndugu" Chancler. The recording was the end product of several years of live interaction between the four, often backing other artists. The album is representative of early 1990s jazz fusion. The band recorded a follow-up entitled Update (without Johnson) which was released in 1995 on the Hip-Bop label. Rushen's next solo album was Anything but Ordinary, released in 1994.

Track listing
 "Groove Now and Then" (Patrice Rushen) - 5:58
 "Walk Your Talk" (Rushen, Ndugu Chancler, Alphonso Johnson, Ernie Watts) - 4:28
 "Steppin' Out" (Chancler, Johnson) - 5:16
 "And I Think About It All the Time" (Watts, Ray Dewey) - 5:20
 "The Meeting" (Rushen) - 5:04
 "African Flower" (Duke Ellington) - 5:20
 "Joyful Noise" (Watts, Bob Boykin) - 5:20
 "Cherry Blossom" (Rushen) - 4:53
 "Lowness" (Chancler) - 4:38
 "Element of Mystery" (Chancler) - 4:53
 "Virgin" (Johnson) - 4:19
 "Tango" (Chancler) - 4:55

Personnel 
The Meeting
 Patrice Rushen – acoustic grand piano, Yamaha SY77, Yamaha DX7 II-FD, Yamaha KX-88, Yamaha KX-5, Yamaha TX816, Yamaha TX16W, Yamaha RX-5 drum machine
 Alphonso Johnson – 4-string and 5-string basses, fretless bass
 Leon "Ndugu" Chancler – drums, cymbals, percussion, timbales, rapping (3)
 Ernie Watts – alto saxophone, soprano saxophone, tenor saxophone, Yamaha WX7

References

External links
[ AllMusic: The Meeting Review]

1990 albums
Patrice Rushen albums